3,4′-Dihydroxystilbene is a stilbenoid found in the roots of Hydrangea macrophylla.

See also
 4,4'-Dihydroxystilbene
 Resveratrol

References

Stilbenoids